Jane Weyallon Armstrong is a Canadian politician in the Northwest Territories. She was elected to the Legislative Assembly of the Northwest Territories in a 2021 by-election, representing the electoral district of Monfwi.

In addition to being the first female MLA for Monfwi, Weyallon Armstrong's election gave the Legislative Assembly a majority of women legislators, a first in Canada.

She lives in Behchokǫ̀. Prior to her election to the Legislative Assembly, Weyallon Armstrong was a town councillor in Behchokǫ̀. She is currently the president of the Native Women's Association of the Northwest Territories.

References 

Living people
Members of the Legislative Assembly of the Northwest Territories
People from Behchoko
21st-century Canadian politicians
Year of birth missing (living people)